Westwood Independent School District is a public school district based in Palestine, Texas (USA).  The district serves part of Palestine and rural areas in west central Anderson County.

In 2009, the school district was rated "academically acceptable" by the Texas Education Agency.

Schools
Westwood High School (Grades 9-12)
Westwood Junior High School (Grades 7-8)
Westwood Elementary School (Grades 3-6)
Westwood Primary School (Grades EE-2)

References

External links

School districts in Anderson County, Texas